Tekulapalle, Tekulapalli or Tekulapally is a Mandal in Bhadradri Kothagudem district of Telangana state, India.

Demographics
According to Indian census, 2001, the demographic details of Tekulapalle mandal is as follows:
 Total Population: 	43,961	in 9,685 Households. 	
 Male Population: 	22,186	and Female Population: 	21,775		
 Children Under 6-years of age: 7,851	(Boys - 3,956 and Girls -	3,895)
 Total Literates: 	14,527

Villages
The villages in Tekulapally mandal includes: Bethampudi, Golya thanda, Thommido mile, sulanagar, Boddu Thanda, shanthi nagar, gollagudem, Bodu, Gangaram, Gollapalle, Koppurai, Koyagudem, Pegallapadu, Sambunigudem, Sulanagar, Tekulapalli and Thadikalapudi in Koyagudem panchaithi thandas jethyathanda, Kothathanda, Chukalabodu, Hanumathanda, Samyathanda, Danthalthada, Madrasthanda, Babojithanda, Rauoolpadu, Chintham chelaka, Mangal thanda, Tejavath thanda in Tekulapalli, Dasuthanda

References

Mandals in Bhadradri Kothagudem district